The 2017 CONCACAF League (officially the 2017 Scotiabank CONCACAF League for sponsorship purposes) was the inaugural edition of the CONCACAF League, a football club competition organized by CONCACAF, the regional governing body of North America, Central America, and the Caribbean.

The tournament was created as part of a new CONCACAF club competition platform consisting of two tournaments (CONCACAF League and CONCACAF Champions League) and a total of 31 teams competing during the season (an increase from the previous 24 teams), with 16 teams competing in the CONCACAF League from August to October, and the winner of the CONCACAF League joining the 15 direct entrants competing in the CONCACAF Champions League from February to April. Details of the inaugural edition of the CONCACAF League was confirmed on 8 May 2017.

Olimpia defeated Santos de Guápiles in the final, and qualified for the 2018 CONCACAF Champions League.

Qualification
A total of 16 teams participate in the CONCACAF League:
Central American Zone: 13 teams (from six associations; ordinarily from seven associations, but Guatemalan teams were excluded from this season's tournament)
Caribbean Zone: 3 teams (from two or three associations)

Therefore, teams from either 8 or 9 out of the 41 CONCACAF member associations may participate in the CONCACAF League.

Central America
The 13 berths for the Central American Football Union (UNCAF) are allocated to the seven UNCAF member associations as follows: two berths for each of Costa Rica, El Salvador, Guatemala, Honduras, Panama, and Nicaragua, and one berth for Belize.

All of the leagues of Central America employ a split season with two tournaments in one season, so the following teams qualify for the CONCACAF League:
In the league of Costa Rica, the champions with the worse aggregate record, and the non-champions with the best aggregate record, qualify. If there is any team which are champions of both tournaments, the non-champions with the second best aggregate record qualify.
In the leagues of El Salvador, Guatemala, Honduras, and Panama, the champions with the worse aggregate record, and the runners-up with the better aggregate record (or any team which are runners-up of both tournaments), qualify. If there is any team which are finalists of both tournaments, the runners-up with the worse aggregate record qualify. If there are any two teams which are finalists of both tournaments, the semi-finalists with the best aggregate record qualify.
In the league of Nicaragua, both champions qualify. If there is any team which are champions of both tournaments, the runners-up with the better aggregate record (or any team which are runners-up of both tournaments) qualify.
In the league of Belize, the champions with the better aggregate record (or any team which are champions of both tournaments) qualify.

If teams from any Central American associations are excluded, they are replaced by teams from other Central American associations, with the associations chosen based on results from previous CONCACAF Champions League tournaments. For this season, the two teams from Guatemala were excluded due to the suspension of their federation by FIFA and were replaced by an additional team each from Panama and Honduras.

Caribbean
The three berths for the Caribbean Football Union (CFU) are allocated via the Caribbean Club Championship, a subcontinental tournament open to the clubs of all 31 CFU member associations. To qualify for the Caribbean Club Championship, teams have to finish as the champions or runners-up of their respective association's league in the previous season, but professional teams may also be selected by their associations if they play in the league of another country.

The runners-up, third-placed and fourth-placed teams of the Caribbean Club Championship qualify for the CONCACAF League.

Teams
The following 16 teams (from eight associations) qualified for the tournament.

Notes

Draw

The draw for the 2017 CONCACAF League was held on 31 May 2017, 19:00 EDT (UTC−4), at the Hilton Miami Airport Hotel in Miami, and was streamed on YouTube.

The draw determined each tie in the round of 16 (numbered 1 through 8) between a team from Pot 1 and a team from Pot 2, each containing eight teams. The "Bracket Position Pots" (Pot A and Pot B) contained the bracket positions numbered 1 through 8 corresponding to each tie. The teams from Pot 1 were assigned a bracket position from Pot A and the teams from Pot 2 were assigned a bracket position from Pot B. Teams from the same association could not be drawn against each other in the round of 16 except for "wildcard" teams which replaced a team from another association.

The 16 teams were distributed in the pots as follows:

Format
In the CONCACAF League, the 16 teams played a single-elimination tournament. Each tie was played on a home-and-away two-legged basis. If the aggregate score was tied after the second leg, the away goals rule would be applied, and if still tied, the penalty shoot-out would be used to determine the winner (Regulations, II. D. Tie-Breaker Procedures).

Schedule
The schedule of the competition was as follows.

All times were Eastern Daylight Time, i.e., UTC−4 (local times were in parentheses).

Bracket

Round of 16
In the round of 16, the matchups were decided by draw: R16-1 through R16-8. The teams from Pot 1 in the draw hosted the second leg.

Summary
The first legs were played on 1–3 August, and the second legs were played on 8–10 August 2017.

|}

Matches

Santos de Guápiles won 8–3 on aggregate.

Chorrillo won 2–0 on aggregate.

Árabe Unido won 5–1 on aggregate.

1–1 on aggregate. Águila won 4–3 on penalties.

Olimpia won 3–0 on aggregate.

Alianza won 4–2 on aggregate.

1–1 on aggregate. Plaza Amador won 5–4 on penalties.

Walter Ferretti won 5–1 on aggregate.

Quarter-finals
In the quarter-finals, the matchups were determined as follows:
QF1: Winner R16-1 vs. Winner R16-2
QF2: Winner R16-3 vs. Winner R16-4
QF3: Winner R16-5 vs. Winner R16-6
QF4: Winner R16-7 vs. Winner R16-8
The winners of round of 16 matchups 1, 3, 5, 7 hosted the second leg.

Summary
The first legs were played on 15–17 August, and the second legs were played on 22–24 August 2017.

|}

Matches

Santos de Guápiles won 2–0 on aggregate.

Árabe Unido won 2–1 on aggregate.

Olimpia won 3–2 on aggregate.

Plaza Amador won 2–1 on aggregate.

Semi-finals
In the semi-finals, the matchups were determined as follows:
SF1: Winner QF1 vs. Winner QF2
SF2: Winner QF3 vs. Winner QF4
The semi-finalists in each tie which had the better performance in previous rounds hosted the second leg.

Summary
The first legs were played on 13–14 September, and the second legs were played on 21 September 2017.

|}

Matches

Santos de Guápiles won 1–0 on aggregate.

Olimpia won 8–2 on aggregate.

Final

In the final (Winner SF1 vs. Winner SF2), the finalists which had the better performance in previous rounds hosted the second leg.

Summary
The first leg was played on 19 October, and the second leg was played on 26 October 2017.

|}

Matches

1–1 on aggregate. Olimpia won 4–1 on penalties.

Top goalscorers

Awards

See also
2018 CONCACAF Champions League

References

External links

 
2017
2
2018 CONCACAF Champions League
August 2017 sports events in North America
September 2017 sports events in North America
October 2017 sports events in North America